The Cameroon or Cameroon Dwarf is a Cameroonian breed of domestic sheep. It belongs to the West African Dwarf group of breeds. Some have been exported to Europe.

Characteristics 

The Cameroon Dwarf is a hardy sheep. It is normally brown with a black belly and black markings to the head and legs. Has a hair coat, and in winter grows a fine under-coat; it sheds this in springtime. Ewes have high prolificacy and mature early; they are capable of producing three crops of lambs every two years.

References

Further reading 
Fitzhugh und Bradford (eds.): Hairsheep of West Africa and the Americas. A genetic resource for the tropics. 1983
R.M. Njwe und Y. Manjeli: Milk yield of Cameroon dwarf blackbelly sheep - Production laitière de moutons Djallonké au Cameroun. In: Small ruminant research and development in Africa - Réseau africain de recherche sur les petits ruminants. ILCA Research Report - 2, 1982, X5520/B

Sheep breeds
Sheep breeds originating in Cameroon